Varayev or Varaev is a Chechen masculine surname, its feminine counterpart is Varayeva or Varaeva. It may refer to
Adlan Varayev (1962–2016), Russian-Chechen wrestler 
Bashir Varaev (born 1964), Chechen judoka

Chechen-language surnames